Anaxibia is a genus of cribellate araneomorph spiders in the family Dictynidae, and was first described by Tamerlan Thorell in 1898.

Species
 it contains seven species restricted to Asia and parts of Africa:
Anaxibia caudiculata Thorell, 1898 (type) – Myanmar
Anaxibia difficilis (Kraus, 1960) – São Tomé and Príncipe
Anaxibia folia Sankaran & Sebastian, 2017 – India
Anaxibia nigricauda (Simon, 1905) – Sri Lanka
Anaxibia peteri (Lessert, 1933) – Angola
Anaxibia pictithorax (Kulczyński, 1908) – Indonesia (Java)
Anaxibia rebai (Tikader, 1966) – India (mainland, Andaman Is.)

References

Araneomorphae genera
Dictynidae
Spiders of Africa
Spiders of Asia
Taxa named by Tamerlan Thorell